Elrich Kock is a South African rugby union player, currently playing with Eastern Province Grand Challenge club side Despatch.

References

South African rugby union players
Eastern Province Elephants players
Living people
1991 births
Rugby union props
Rugby union players from the Eastern Cape